Yu Wa is a tambon (subdistrict) of San Pa Tong District, in Chiang Mai Province, Thailand. In 2020 it had a total population of 12,983 people.

Administration

Central administration
The tambon is subdivided into 15 administrative villages (muban).

Local administration
The area of the subdistrict is shared by 2 local governments.
the subdistrict municipality (Thesaban Tambon) San Pa Tong (เทศบาลตำบลสันป่าตอง)
the subdistrict municipality (Thesaban Tambon) Yu Wa (เทศบาลตำบลยุหว่า)

References

External links
Thaitambon.com on Yu Wa

Tambon of Chiang Mai province
Populated places in Chiang Mai province